Paris Green is a 1920 American silent comedy film directed by Jerome Storm and written by Julien Josephson. The film stars Charles Ray, Ann May, Bert Woodruff, Gertrude Claire, Donald MacDonald, and Gordon Mullen. The film was released in June 1920, by Paramount Pictures.

Plot
As described in a film magazine, Corporal Luther Green (Ray), famously known as Paris Green, has one hour to see Paris before sailing home. At lunch he meets Ninon (May), a French girl who is planning to visit her uncle in America. Luther gives her his address. Luther finds upon his return to Quigley Corners, New Jersey, that his former sweetheart has transferred her affections to another, so he decides to go to New York City and forget her. On the road to the railroad station he meets Ninon, who having missed her uncle at the pier was going to the only address in the United States that she knows. Luther takes her back to his family's farm and advertises in the papers. Ninon's uncle arrives in response to the advertisement at about the same time as two crooks do. The crooks had failed to kidnap Ninon in New York, but are successful in the country. After a hard ride by horseback Luther catches up to the speeding car and rescues Ninon.

Cast
Charles Ray as Luther Green
Ann May as	Ninon Robinet
Bert Woodruff as Mathew Green
Gertrude Claire as Sarah Green
Donald MacDonald as Jules Benoit
Gordon Mullen as 'Hairpin' Petrie
Norris Johnson as Edith Gleason
William Courtright	as Malachi Miller
Ida Lewis as Mrs. Miller
Otto Hoffman as Andre Robinet

Preservation
The film is preserved with a copy held at the George Eastman House Motion Picture Collection.

References

External links

1920 films
1920s English-language films
Silent American comedy films
1920 comedy films
Paramount Pictures films
Films directed by Jerome Storm
American black-and-white films
American silent feature films
1920s American films